The Allentown Brooks were a minor league baseball team that operated from 1935–1936. The nickname was derived from their parent team, the Brooklyn Dodgers. They played in the New York–Pennsylvania League and were based in Allentown, Pennsylvania. The ballclub was previously known as the Reading Brooks before moving to Allentown midway through the 1935 season, largely as a measure to reduce operating costs. In 1941 the Brooklyn Dodgers affiliate Reading Brooks played in the Inter-State League

Team Records

Single Season

Hitting

Batting Average – .379, Nick Tremark 1936
Hits – 204, Nick Tremark 1936
Doubles – 36, Nick Tremark 1936
Triples – 22, Johnny Hudson 1936
Home Runs – 7, Johnny McCarthy 1935
At Bats – 538, Nick Tremark 1936
Games Played – 141, Nick Tremark 1936

Pitching

Wins – 19, Harry Eisenstat 1936
Losses – 15, Bob Barr 1936
ERA – 2.96, Walter Signer 1936
Appearances – 45, Jake Houtekamer 1935
Innings Pitched – 257.0, Harry Eisenstat 1936

Career

Hitting

Hits – 368, Nick Tremark
Doubles – 69, Nick Tremark
Triples – 24, Nick Tremark
Home Runs – 7, Johnny McCarthy
At-Bats – 1031, Nick Tremark
Games Played – 277, Nick Tremark

Pitching

Wins – 19, Harry Eisenstat
Losses – 17, Harvey Green
Appearances – 74, Jake Houtekamer
Innings Pitched – 257.0, Harry Eisenstat

Major League Alumni

The Brooks had many players that went on to Major League Baseball playing time to varying degrees of success. The 1935 Brooks featured 10 players that would reach the Major Leagues and five players that had already accumulated Major League service time for a total of 15 players that had already reached or would reach the Major Leagues out of 43 players that played for the Brooks that year. The 1936 Brooks had 19 players that had either already reached or would reach the Major Leagues out of the 35 players that played for the Brooks.

Pitchers

RHP Bob Barr (1936)
RHP Charlie Eckert (1935–1936)
LHP Harry Eisenstat (1936)
RHP John Gaddy (1936)
RHP Harvey Green (1935–1936)
RHP Bob Katz (1935)
LHP Frank Lamanske (1935)
RHP Walter Signer (1935–1936)
LHP Dick Stone (1936)
RHP Hank Winston (1936)

Catchers

Zack Taylor (1935)
Ralph Onis (1935–1936)

Infielders

2B Bill Adair (1936)
2B George Fallon (1935–1936)
2B Ben Geraghty (1936)
SS Johnny Hudson (1936)
1B Johnny McCarthy (1935)
SS Jack Radtke (1935–1936)
3B Al Reiss (1936)
3B Woody Williams (1936)

Outfielders

Walt Bashore (1935–1936)
George Cisar (1936)
Art Parks (1936)
Frank Skaff (1935)
Nick Tremark (1935–1936)
Eddie Wilson (1936)

References

1935 establishments in Pennsylvania
1936 disestablishments in Pennsylvania
Baseball in Allentown, Pennsylvania
Brooklyn Dodgers minor league affiliates
Eastern League (1938–present) teams
Defunct baseball teams in Pennsylvania
Defunct Eastern League (1938–present) teams
Defunct New York–Penn League teams
Baseball teams established in 1935
Baseball teams disestablished in 1936